Señorita México U.S. is an annual beauty pageant that brings together Mexican women from all over the United States to compete for the national title of Señorita Mexico U.S in Las Vegas, Nevada. The winner of the contest gets to compete abroad at the Miss Globe International pageant.
 
The current Señorita Mexico U.S. is Gemma Kassandra Mendoza of Chihuahua an economics graduate from University of Colorado at Boulder who was crowned on May 17th, 2015 in Las Vegas, Nevada.

The pageant was interrupted in 2007 and reinstated in 2010 due to a lawsuit with regards to the Señorita Mexico U.S Trademark, which The Miss Mexico Organization was able to keep after a successful settlement and a three years legal dispute against Miss Universe.

Recent titleholders

See also 
 Señorita Mexico

References

External links
 http://www.missmexicous.com/2/confidential/press.htm
 http://www.1888pressrelease.com/jocell-villa-was-crowned-this-past-sunday-september-12th-sen-pr-242219.html
 http://www.prlog.org/10095856-miss-universe-drops-lawsuit-against-the-miss-mexico-organization.html
 http://www.prlog.org/12244331-seorita-mexico-us-20132014-at-planet-hollywood-resort-and-casino-las-vegas.html
 http://www.prlog.org/12260615-setareh-khatibi-crowned-miss-mexico-us-20132014-at-the-planet-hollywood-in-las-vegas.html
 http://www.1888pressrelease.com/sarah-lopez-from-michocan-is-crowned-senorita-mexico-u-s-20-pr-332418.html
 http://www.washingtonbanglaradio.com/content/121763210-se-orita-mexico-us-beauty-pageant
 http://www.pr.com/press-release/27680
 http://www.prlog.org/12365629-jocell-villa-miss-mexico-us-to-the-miss-globe-international.html

External links
 Official WebSite

Beauty pageants in the United States
History of women in Nevada
Culture of Las Vegas
Mexico–United States relations

hu:Miss Mexikó